Luís Fellipe Rodrigues Mota (born 25 September 2003) is a Portuguese professional footballer who plays as a forward for Porto B.

Club career
A youth product of Belenenses SAD, he signed his first professional contract with the club in the summer of 2020. He made his professional debut with B-SAD in a 1–0 Taça da Liga loss to Mafra on 24 July 2021.

References

External links

2003 births
Living people
Footballers from Lisbon
Portuguese footballers
Portuguese people of Cape Verdean descent
Association football forwards
Belenenses SAD players
FC Porto B players
Primeira Liga players
Liga Portugal 2 players
Campeonato de Portugal (league) players